2nd Regiment may refer to:

Active units

British Army
2nd Royal Tank Regiment

United States
2nd Aviation Regiment (United States)
2nd Air Defense Artillery Regiment
2nd Cavalry Regiment (United States)
2nd Marine Regiment (United States)
2nd Infantry Regiment (United States)
2nd Field Artillery Regiment (United States)

Australian Army
2nd Cavalry Regiment (Australia) - armoured reconnaissance unit
2nd/14th Light Horse Regiment - armoured reconnaissance unit
2nd/10th Medium Regiment, Royal Australian Artillery

French Army
2nd Foreign Engineer Regiment - French Foreign Legion Combat engineering unit
2nd Foreign Parachute Regiment - French Foreign Legion airborne commando unit
2nd Marine Infantry Parachute Regiment - airborne unit
2nd Foreign Infantry Regiment - French Foreign Legion unit

Belgian Army
2nd/4th Regiment Mounted Rifles - armoured reconnaissance unit
2nd/4th Lancers Regiment - tank unit
2nd Field Artillery Regiment/Field Artillery Battery ParaCommando

Italian Army
2nd Alpini Regiment
2nd Alpine Signal Regiment
2nd Alpine Engineer Regiment
2nd Alpine Artillery Regiment

Canadian Army
2nd Field Regiment, Royal Canadian Artillery

Portuguese Army
2nd Lancers Regiment - Portuguese army military police unit

Former units

 2nd Infantry Regiment (Lithuania) - Lithuanian interwar infantry regiment

2nd Infantry Regiment (South Korea) - Korean War unit
2nd Guards Field Artillery - Imperial German Army World War I unit
2/6th Cavalry Commando Regiment (Australia) - World War II unit
2nd Regiment of Light Cavalry Lancers of the Imperial Guard (the "Red Lancers" - a Napoleonic French unit, originally raised as the Guard Hussars of the Kingdom of Holland

Polish Army 

 2nd Armoured Regiment (Poland) - Polish army World War II unit
 2nd Legions' Infantry Regiment

British Army 

2nd East Anglian Regiment - Short lived British army unit
64th (2nd Staffordshire) Regiment of Foot - British army
2nd Tangier Regiment - British Army
65th (2nd Yorkshire, North Riding) Regiment of Foot - British army

British Indian Army 

 2nd Punjab Regiment - British Indian army unit
 2nd Queen Victoria's Own Rajput Light Infantry - British Indian army

Yugoslavia 

2nd Yugoslav Assault Regiment - Yugoslav Air Force World War II unit
2nd Training Aviation Regiment - Yugoslav Air Force post-World War II unit

Greek Army 

2nd Serres Regiment, Greek army
 2/21 Cretan Regiment, Greek army
 2/39 Evzone Regiment, Greek army

American Civil War units

Union Army
2nd United States Infantry Regiment (Civil War)
2nd United States Volunteer Sharpshooter Regiment
2nd Alabama Volunteer Infantry Regiment (African Descent)
2nd Regiment Illinois Volunteer Cavalry
2nd Regiment Indiana Cavalry
2nd Iowa Regiment
2nd Regiment Iowa Volunteer Cavalry
2nd Regiment Kansas Volunteer Infantry (African Descent)
2nd Maine Volunteer Infantry Regiment
2nd Maryland Infantry
2nd Regiment of Cavalry, Massachusetts Volunteers
2nd Regiment Massachusetts Volunteer Heavy Artillery
2nd Regiment Massachusetts Volunteer Infantry
2nd Michigan Volunteer Cavalry Regiment
2nd Michigan Volunteer Infantry Regiment
2nd Minnesota Volunteer Cavalry Regiment
2nd Nebraska Cavalry
2nd New Hampshire Volunteer Regiment
2nd New York Volunteer Infantry Regiment
2nd Ohio Infantry
2nd Regiment South Carolina Volunteer Infantry (African Descent)
2nd West Virginia Veteran Volunteer Infantry Regiment
2nd West Virginia Volunteer Cavalry Regiment
2nd West Virginia Volunteer Infantry Regiment
2nd Wisconsin Volunteer Infantry Regiment
2nd Regiment Wisconsin Volunteer Cavalry

Confederate Army
2nd Regiment Alabama Volunteer Cavalry (Confederate)
2nd Kentucky Infantry
2nd Infantry (2nd Palmetto Regiment)
2nd Virginia Infantry

American Revolutionary War units
2nd Canadian Regiment
2nd Connecticut Regiment
2nd Georgia Regiment
2nd Maryland Regiment
2nd Massachusetts Regiment
2nd New Hampshire Regiment
2nd New Jersey Regiment
2nd New York Regiment
2nd North Carolina Regiment
2nd Pennsylvania Regiment
2nd Rhode Island Regiment
2nd South Carolina Regiment
2nd Virginia Regiment
2nd Albany County Militia Regiment

Spanish–American War units 
 2nd Oregon Volunteer Infantry Regiment
 2nd Virginia Volunteer Infantry (1898)

Others 
Nevers' 2nd Regiment Band